Younger is an American comedy-drama television series created and produced by Darren Star. It is based on the 2005 novel of the same title by Pamela Redmond Satran. The single-camera series premiered on TV Land on March 31, 2015, and has since received generally positive reviews from critics. Ahead of the fifth season's premiere, it was renewed for a sixth season, which premiered on June 12, 2019. In July 2019, TV Land renewed the series for a seventh and final season, making it the longest running original series in the network's history.

Sutton Foster stars as Liza Miller, a 40-year-old divorcee who has to manage her career in a publishing company having faked her identity as a younger woman to get her job, while her romantic and professional lives are measured against up-and-comings. Hilary Duff, Debi Mazar, Miriam Shor, and Nico Tortorella co-star in major supporting roles in the first season, with Molly Bernard and Peter Hermann in recurring roles. For the second season, Bernard and Hermann were promoted to series regulars. Charles Michael Davis had a recurring role in the fourth season and was promoted to the main cast for the fifth season. However, for the seventh and final season, Shor and Davis were downgraded to recurring guest stars, as they each appeared in only one episode of the season.

The series moved from TV Land to Paramount+ and Hulu for its seventh and final season, which premiered on April 15, 2021, and concluded on June 10, 2021. The seventh season was later aired on TV Land.

Synopsis
Set in New York City, the story follows the personal and professional life of Liza Miller, who is now single and all alone in her 40s following a contentious divorce from her gambling-addicted husband, and learning that her only daughter decided to live in India full time. After a run in with a 26 year old tattoo artist, Josh, who believes he and Liza are the same age, she devises a plan to pass herself off as a 20-something in order to re-enter the world of publishing, which has gotten rather ageist over the years, and becomes assistant to the head of Empirical Press Marketing Chief Diana Trout while befriending Kelsey Peters, her coworker. She finds it hard to live the best of both worlds as she has to balance her old middle age life with her renewed 20s.

Cast and characters

Main 
 Sutton Foster as Liza Miller, a 40-year-old divorced mother
 Debi Mazar as Maggie Amato, Liza's lesbian artist best friend and roommate
 Miriam Shor as Diana Trout, Liza's temperamental boss, who works as head of marketing at Empirical Press (seasons 1–6; guest season 7)
 Nico Tortorella as Josh, a 26-year-old tattoo artist who owns his studio
 Hilary Duff as Kelsey Peters, a 26-year-old book editor at Empirical Press who befriends Liza after they start working together
 Molly Bernard as Lauren Heller, Kelsey's 20-something friend (seasons 2–7; recurring season 1)
 Peter Hermann as Charles Brooks, head and heir of Empirical Press (season 2–7; recurring season 1)
 Charles Michael Davis as Zane Anders, an editor at Rivington who competes with Kelsey to discover who's best (seasons 5–6; recurring season 4; guest season 7)

Recurring 
 Dan Amboyer as Thad and Chad Weber, twin brothers with strange behavior. Thad was Kelsey's boyfriend, until his death. Afterwards, Chad appeared and began to pursue Kelsey.
 Tessa Albertson as Caitlin Miller, Liza's college-age daughter
 Thorbjørn Harr as Anton Björnberg, a Swedish writer who got his book signed at Empirical Press. He and Kelsey were having an affair while Kelsey was working on his book.
 Paul Fitzgerald as David Taylor, Liza's ex-husband and Caitlin's father
 Jon Gabrus as Gabe, one of Josh's nerdy friends
 Kathy Najimy as Denise Heller, Lauren's mother
 Michael Urie as Redmond, an agent and social media icon
 Noah Robbins as Bryce Reiger, a 20-something tech billionaire who is interested in investing in Empirical
 Ben Rappaport as Max Horowitz, Lauren's ex-boyfriend
 Jay Wilkison as Colin McNichol, a writer who infatuates Kelsey
 Mather Zickel as Dr. Richard Caldwell, a doctor who starts a relationship with Diana
 Meredith Hagner as Montana Goldberg / Amy, a barista friend of Maggie. She starts working as Maggie's assistant and hooking up with Josh, but he soon discovers that she was copying Maggie's arts.
 Aasif Mandvi as Jay Malic, A man who discovers Liza's secret and befriends her
 Burke Moses as Lachlan Flynn, a spy novelist who becomes the motive of Zane and Kelsey's quarrel
 Jennifer Westfeldt as Pauline Turner-Brooks, Charles' ex-wife, with whom he has two daughters, and who naively believes that they can get back together
 Chris Tardio as Enzo, Diana's plumber boyfriend
 Phoebe Dynevor as Clare, an Irish citizen who begins dating Josh after Liza's recommendation. She and Josh then plan a green card marriage in Ireland.
 Laura Benanti as Quinn Tyler (seasons 5–7), a businesswoman and author who purchases Empirical Press and makes Kelsey the head publisher of Millennial. She later dates Charles.
 Janeane Garofalo as Cass Dekenessey (season 7), the dean of a local art school who hires Maggie as an Artist in Residence

Guest 
 Martha Plimpton as Cheryl Sussman, a rival publisher who knew Liza early in her career and threatens to expose her
 Richard Masur as Edward L.L. Moore, the writer of Crown of Kings, one of Empirical Press' biggest-selling novel series, which is a homage to George R. R. Martin's A Song of Ice and Fire. The character himself is a homage to Martin, having similarity to Martin's physical traits.
 Camryn Manheim as Dr. Jane Wray, a famous therapist who records a podcast which inspires a book called The Deciding Decade
 Lois Smith as Belinda Lacroix, a romance novelist, one of Empirical Press' oldest members. After decades of successful works, she dies during a lunch with Liza, Charles and Diana.
 Jesse James Keitel as Tam, Lauren's personal assistant

Episodes

Production

Development 

The series is based on the Pamela Redmond Satran's novel of the same name. In October 2013, TV Land ordered the pilot from creator and executive producer Darren Star. Patricia Field, who worked with Star on Sex and the City, is a costume consultant on the production. The pilot was picked up to series in April 2014, with a 12-episode order. On April 21, 2015, Younger was renewed for a second season of 12 episodes, which premiered on January 13, 2016. Ahead of the fifth season's premiere, it was renewed for a sixth season, which premiered on June 12, 2019. On July 24, 2019, TV Land renewed the series for a seventh season, making it the longest running original series in the network's history. The series moved from TV Land to Paramount+ and Hulu with the seventh and final season which premiered on April 15, 2021 with the first 4 episodes available immediately and the rest debuting on a weekly basis.

Casting 
Sutton Foster was cast in the lead role of Liza Miller in December 2013. Hilary Duff and Miriam Shor joined the main cast in the following month. Debi Mazar was cast in February 2014. After a recurring role in the first season, Molly Bernard was added to the main cast from the second season onward. In February 2018, it was announced that Charles Michael Davis had been promoted to series regular, after appearing in a recurring capacity in the fourth season. On March 14, 2018, it was announced that Christian Borle would appear in the fifth season in a guest starring role playing the journalist Don Ridley in two episodes. On May 4, 2018, it was confirmed that Laura Benanti would appear in the fifth season, playing a self-made billionaire named Quinn. On March 17, 2021, it was announced that Miriam Shor and Charles Michael Davis have been demoted to recurring guest stars for the seventh and final season. In April 2021, Janeane Garofalo was cast in a recurring role for the final season.

Release

Broadcast 
The series aired on NickMom from September 16 to September 27 2015, On September 5, 2018, it was announced that the series would be moved to Paramount Network from the sixth season onward; however, it was announced on April 3, 2019 that the series would stay on TV Land. Broadcasters carrying Younger include M3, E!, and CTV 2 in Canada; and Sony and Comedy Central in the United Kingdom.

Marketing 
In June 2018, during the opening night screening at the annual ATX Television Festival in Austin, Texas, a first look at the second episode of the fifth season was showcased, whilst a panel discussion with Darren Star and cast members took place. That same month, the book Marriage Vacation, mentioned in the series, was launched in real life by Simon & Schuster. In June 2019, the sixth-season premiere was also screened at the ATX Television Festival, followed by an interview with cast member Debi Mazar and writers Sarah Choi and Joe Murphy.

Reception

Ratings

Critical response

Younger has received critical acclaim. Rotten Tomatoes gives the first season an approval rating of 97% based on 37 reviews, and an average rating of 7.6/10. The site's critical consensus reads, "Darren Star's witty writing and Sutton Foster's charisma help elevate Younger above some of TV Land's previous sitcoms." Metacritic gives the first season a weighted average score of 75 out of 100, based on 20 critics, indicating "generally favorable reviews".

On Rotten Tomatoes, the second season has an approval rating of 100% based on 8 reviews, and an average rating of 7.1/10. Metacritic gave the season a score of 74 out of 100, based on reviews from 4 critics, indicating "generally favorable reviews".

Brian Lowry of Variety gave the series a mostly positive review, describing it as "not perfect but highly watchable" and pointing out that "inevitably, there are stereotypical aspects on both sides of the age gap—from the flakiness of Kelsey's contemporaries to Diana too often coming across as a bitter scold—but the series seldom pitches so far across those lines as to be unable to find its way back."

On the New York magazine website Vulture.com, Margaret Lyons gave a mostly positive review, describing "a sweetness to the series, an almost admiration for the various crummy behaviors [of the characters]." She went on to say that she wished the show "had a longer first season not just because I liked it, but more because it's featherweight, and as its current run stands, might have been better off as a feature-length rom-com." Megan Garber reviewed the show for The Atlantic saying, "Younger, a fairy tale fit for basic cable, is a treacly confection of a show: witty but not wise, delightful but not deep. And yet—like its creator Darren Star’s previous exploration of age and sexuality and identity in a tumultuous time, Sex and the City—it offers, almost in spite of itself, deep insights into the culture of the moment."

Tom Conroy of Media Life Magazine criticized the show mainly for portraying Sutton Foster's character Liza with "early-middle-age cluelessness", featuring "particularly silly" publishing-industry details and presenting "a relationship between an educated 40-year-old mother and a 26-year-old college dropout" that, in his belief, "has nowhere to go."

But Jonathan Alexander writes in the Los Angeles Review of Books that "Younger works in part because it plays to both millennials, who are often portrayed as hip and hardworking, creative and generous, as well as to late Gen-Xers who are facing a corporate and consumer world that's seemingly forgotten them in its drive to cater to the needs, tastes, and interests of a younger (and numerically larger) generation."

Darcie Wilder of Vice wrote in her review: "Younger is unexpectedly addictive, nothing short of extremely soothing and pleasurable to watch. It's a bedtime story that's supposed to lull but is too engaging to ever actually let you doze off. Usually when I binge, there's a hard out when I finally get caught up to real time, entering the headspace of its regular audience and eventually losing interest—but that hasn't happened with Younger, not yet."

The seventh and final season of Younger had good reviews from critics and mixed reviews from fans. Nicole Galluci of Mashable wrote in a review "Ultimately, the episodes are engaging as ever, and though it's rare with final seasons, I find myself struggling to squash the belief that this show still has so much left to give." Fan reacted to the final season with "mixed feelings," according to multiple reports.

Awards and nominations

Cancelled Kelsey Spin-off
It was reported in May 2020 that ViacomCBS and Darren Star have partnered to develop a spin-off series which would revolve around Kelsey Peters, with Hilary Duff starring. However, on June 10, 2021, following the series’ conclusion, it has been revealed that the spin-off is no longer in the works, due to Duff being cast on the How I Met Your Mother spin-off, How I Met Your Father. According to creator Darren Star, he stated that the Kelsey spin-off has been resolved after the series finale, regardless of any notion of one. Star also stated that "it was always going to end with Kelsey doing her own thing, alone, heading to Los Angeles".

International adaptations
South Korean television network JTBC plans to broadcast the Korean adaptation of Younger. It will be directed by Kim Seong-yoon as his first project under JTBC after leaving his longtime home network, KBS.

The series is being adapted in China by Endemol Shine China and Huace Group. It is being remade as a 40-part series in Mandarin with episodes of 45 minutes.

Ukrainian TV channel Novyi Kanal  soon release an adaptation called Молода. The premiere was supposed to take place in the spring of 2022, but due to the war between Russia VS Ukraine, it was postponed to 2023. Showing the series starts March 20, 2023.

References

External links

 
 
 

2010s American comedy-drama television series
2010s American LGBT-related comedy television series
2010s American LGBT-related drama television series
2010s American romantic comedy television series
2010s American workplace comedy television series
2010s American workplace drama television series
2010s romantic drama television series
2020s American comedy-drama television series
2020s American LGBT-related comedy television series
2020s American LGBT-related drama television series
2020s American romantic comedy television series
2020s American workplace comedy television series
2020s American workplace drama television series
2020s romantic drama television series
2015 American television series debuts
2021 American television series endings
Adultery in television
Ageism in fiction
American romantic drama television series
English-language television shows
Lesbian-related television shows
Paramount+ original programming
Television series by Banijay
Television series created by Darren Star
Television shows based on American novels
Television shows filmed in New York City
Television shows set in New York City
TV Land original programming
Works about book publishing and bookselling